Trimellitic acid (benzene-1,2,4-tricarboxylic acid) is a chemical compound with the molecular formula C6H3(СООН)3. Like the other isomers of benzenetricarboxylic acid, trimellitic acid is a colorless solid.  It is prepared by oxidation of 1,2,4-trimethylbenzene.

Isomers
 Hemimellitic acid (benzene-1,2,3-tricarboxylic acid)
 Trimesic acid (benzene-1,3,5-tricarboxylic acid)

See also
 Trimellitic anhydride chloride
 Trimellitic anhydride
 Plasticizer#Trimellitates
 Mellitic acid

References

Tricarboxylic acids
Benzoic acids